Poisons or the World History of Poisoning is a 2001 Russian fantastical absurdist comedy directed by Karen Shakhnazarov.

Plot
Young family of Volkov's, Oleg and Katya, move to an apartment they bought and get acquainted with their neighbor, locksmith Arnold Sharapov. Right during a friendly dinner Katya cheats on her husband. Frustrated Oleg decides to drown his sorrows in alcohol, but at the bar accidentally meets Ivan Petrovich Prokhorov, pensioner, whose wife in his time was also unfaithful. In a conversation with the nice old man, Oleg learns that Prokhorov punished his wife by slipping poison into her yogurt. And now Ivan strongly persuades Oleg to also kill his unfaithful wife, using a small collection of poisons which Prokhorov constantly carries with him.

After some hesitation Oleg decides to do the terrible thing, but random interference from his mother-in-law Eugenia Ivanovna Kholodkova saves the wife of the hapless poisoner. As a result of a family quarrel, Oleg leaves the house and is a guest of Zoya, wife of Arnold, who in turn drove her traitor-husband out of the house. Oleg and Zoya fall in love with each other and decide to live together.

But the former spouses of the loving couple, consumed with anger and envy decide to destroy them. On the advice of the insidious mother-in-law Evgenia Ivanovna, Arnold and Katya want to invite Oleg and Zoya to dinner together and poison them by feeding them contaminated burgers. Learning this, Oleg first seeks the advice of experienced poisoner Prokhorov, who offers a number of retaliatory steps brilliant in their deviousness. But in the end Oleg decides to let go peacefully, both couples divorce, Oleg and Zoya begin together an existence full of love and mutual interests ...

Throughout the action, under the influence of Prokhorov's stories about famous poisoners Oleg often "daydreams", imagining crimes of these villains. Central figure in Oleg's visions becomes Pope Alexander VI Borgia, the famous medieval poisoner and a victim of his own treachery ...

Cast
 Ignat Akrachkov as Oleg Volkov, actor
 Oleg Basilashvili as Ivan Petrovich Prokhorov, pensioner / Pope Alexander VI
 Zhanna Dudanova as Katya, Oleg's wife
 Aleksandr Bashirov as Arnold Sharapov, locksmith
 Olga Tumaykina as Zoya Filimonova, sportswoman, Arnold's wife
 Lyudmila Kasatkina as Eugenia Ivanovna Kholodkova, Oleg's mother-in-law
 Andrei Panin as Cesare Borgia
 Nikolay Afanasyev as Cardinal di Carnet
  as Socrates
 Aleksandr Andreevich as Artaxerxes II of Persia
 Elena Fomina as Parysatis
 Veronika Nikolaeva as Stateira, Artaxerxes's wife
 Marina Kazankova as Lucrezia Borgia
 Ekaterina Klimova as Jeanne d'Albret
 Elena Obukhova as Madame de Brinvilliers
 Ivan Lakshin as Nero
 Fedor Shelenkov as Caligula
 Timur Matsiev as Khan Meñli I Giray
 Dmitri Dyuzhev as Dr. Edme Costa 
 Yelena Zakharova as actress in the theater

Awards
The film was awarded the Grand Prix at the Kinotavr film festival in Sochi. At the Karlovy Vary International Film Festival the picture was nominated for the Crystal Globe  and was screened at the Berlin International Film Festival.

References

External links

2000s Russian-language films
Russian comedy films
2001 comedy films
2001 films
Films directed by Karen Shakhnazarov